Rage is a German heavy metal band formed in 1984 by Peter "Peavy" Wagner. They were part of the German heavy/speed/power metal scene which emerged in the early to mid-1980s, and have been referred to as one of the country's so-called "big four" of power metal, along with Grave Digger, Helloween and Running Wild.

Rage was formed in 1984 under the name Avenger. After releasing their debut album Prayers of Steel and their Depraved to Black EP in 1985, the band changed their name to Rage because there was another band in England that shared the same name. Originally the new name was meant to be Furious Rage but it was eventually shortened to Rage.

13 musicians have been part of Rage over the years, with the most successful line-up being from the period now known as the Refuge years; this line-up featured Manni Schmidt and Chris Efthimiadis. The second notable line-up was the one formed with Mike Terrana and Victor Smolski.

Through the years, Rage established themselves as a notably successful band and as pioneers of the power metal scene, including in their music elements of progressive metal and classical music. In 1996, Rage was one of the first metal bands to write and record an album with a full symphonic orchestra: Lingua Mortis.

Rage has released 26 albums (counting the "Avenger" and "LMO" releases) over the past 30 years (in total more than 50 releases counting DVDs, EPs, Japan editions, and VHS). A remarkable international success with more than five million records sold, Rage has had more than 40 music chart entries.

History

From Avenger to Rage (1984–1986) 
Rage began in 1984 in Herne when Peavy Wagner (bass and vocals), along with drummer Jörg Michael and guitarist Jochen Schroeder, first got together under the name "Avenger". Following the arrival of their debut album recorded in 1984, Prayers of Steel released by Wishbone Records, followed by an EP Depraved to Black in August 1985, Avenger changed their name and became Rage, and got a record deal at Noise releasing their first official LP, Reign of Fear, on 12 May 1986.

Noise years (1986–1994) 
On 11 May 1987 they released the album Execution Guaranteed under the label Noise. In the same year they released their first official video clip "Down by Law" as well, introducing the new line-up with Manni Schmidt and Chris Efthimiadis.

With this new line-up in 1988 the album Perfect Man was released, having as a single the song "Don't Fear the Winter" which became a hit in the scene. The band began touring with Running Wild, U.D.O., Motörhead and Saxon. In 1989 Rage released the album Secrets in a Weird World, hitting the charts with the single "Invisible Horizons", also a highlight in the career of the band.

The early 1990s: their 1992 album Trapped! marked their international breakthrough, hitting the charts worldwide. As a result, the band performed their first major tour in Japan.
Their success was repeated in 1993 with the release of The Missing Link. This Album turned out to become one of the most successful and influencing of this era.

In early 1994, the guitarist Manni Schmidt left the band and Peavy Wagner formed a new line-up with Sven Fischer and Chris Efthimiadis's brother Spiros.

Two guitars years (1994–1999) 
After the change in their lineup, in 1994 Rage went on to record their ten-year anniversary album called 10 Years in Rage, which was the last album released by Noise Records, which was not well promoted by the media. Rage signed with Gun Records the same year and released the breakthrough album Black in Mind, followed by a world tour and several chart entries worldwide. Especially in Japan and Europe, this album brought the band to a different, much higher level and is still seen as a classic of the genre. Several band had simultaneously left Gun Records that year.  

The album Lingua Mortis, recorded in 1996, was the first album on which a metal act collaborated with a classical symphonic orchestra. Their material was performed live for the first time in late summer 1996 in Kufstein, Austria. Subsequently, Rage and the orchestra embarked on a Christmas tour and played several European festivals.

Still in 1996, they launched one of the best albums of his career, End of All Days. With Higher than the Sky and other songs are considered some of the best Power Metal Album of his career.

In March 1998 Rage released their thirteenth album XIII including the Lingua Mortis Orchestra and had considerable success on the charts. XIII was ranked number 272 in Rock Hard magazine's book of The 500 Greatest Rock & Metal Albums of All Time.

After the album XIII, in 1999 Rage continued working with the Lingua Mortis Orchestra for their next album Ghosts. Shortly before the release of the album, the band went through a major line-up change. Peavy Wagner reformed Rage once again and the former members formed the Pop band Sub7even.

The millennium years (1999–2015) 
Peavy recruited the new members Victor Smolski on guitar and Mike Terrana on drums. The trio performed first at Wacken Open Air in August 1999, and released their Album Welcome to the Other Side in 2001. In the following two years, the albums Unity and Soundchaser were released with positive response from critics. Rage toured with Primal Fear in 2002 and Helloween in 2003. The band's 20th anniversary in 2004 was celebrated by the From the Cradle to the Stage tour, where the show in Bochum was recorded and released under the same name on CD and DVD in 2005.

In 2006, Rage again featured a symphonic orchestra, this time from Minsk, Belarus, named "Lingua Mortis Orchestra" that performed on their following album Speak of the Dead. It was the last album with Mike Terrana on drums. On first of January 2007 it was announced, that the new drummer would be André Hilgers, formerly the drummer of Axxis. He was already featured on the 20th anniversary album Into the Light of Nuclear Blast, which was composed, produced and mainly played by Victor, and its lyrics were written by Peavy.

In 2007, the band toured throughout Europe with the orchestra, and their performance at Wacken Open Air in August in front of 80,000 fans was recorded for a DVD to be included as a bonus to their next album. Carved in Stone was released on 22 February 2008. In 2009, the band played at the Bundesvision Song Contest 2009 on 13 February, which was hosted by Stefan Raab (TV total), where they reached third place. Their participating song Gib dich nie auf (Never Give Up) was released on an EP. That year was also the occasion for a 25th anniversary tour, and their Wacken performance—together with guest musicians like Hansi Kürsch—was released on a bonus DVD of the 2011 album Strings to a Web.

Rage entered the studio in October 2011 to begin the recordings of their 21st album, appropriately named 21, for an early 2012 release. Two years later, for the band's 30th anniversary, The Soundchaser Archives, was released, featuring rare and demo songs from the last 30 years of the band. An anniversary tour was performed throughout the entire year and ended in January 2015 with their last show in Sofia.

On 4 February 2015, Peavy Wagner announced that there would not be any further cooperation with Victor Smolski and André Hilgers.

Meanwhile, Peavy renewed contact with his ex-band members Manni Schmidt and Christos Efthimiadis, and played a secret concert in Peavy's hometown Herne under the pseudonym Tres Hombres. After this success they have decided to play again together as Refuge, and confirmed several festival dates for 2015.

Present years (2015–present) 
The new line-up was announced on 18 June 2015, featuring guitarist Marcos Rodriguez (from the band Soundchaser) and drummer Vassilios "Lucky" Maniatopoulos (vocalist and percussionist of the band Tri State Corner and also a former drum technician and apprentice of Chris Efthimiadis). After the EP My Way in January 2016, their album, The Devil Strikes Again, was released on 10 June 2016. A tour was scheduled for the end of the year, followed on 28 July 2017 by another album, Seasons of the Black. The next tour took place in January 2018 with Firewind as special guest.

The 25th studio album Wings of Rage was announced in April 2019, and released in January 2020. On 6 May 2020 Marcos Rodriguez left the band due to personal and private reasons, replaced by Stefan Weber (ex Axxis) and Jean Bormann (Angelinc).

Rage's 26th studio album, Resurrection Day, was released on 17 September 2021.

Side projects

Lingua Mortis Orchestra 

The Lingua Mortis Orchestra (LMO) is the name associated with the orchestras who played with Rage since 1996 on the albums or on stage. Rage's tenth studio album, Lingua Mortis was the first classical album by a metal act, and a collaboration with the Prague Symphony Orchestra.  Later, Rage worked with the orchestras in some of the band's most known albums, such as in XIII and Ghosts. In 2006, an orchestra from Minsk, Belarus, that was also named Lingua Mortis Orchestra, recorded with Rage the Speak of the Dead album, and on the next year, Rage did 2007 several shows with the Lingua Mortis Orchestra, and their performance at Wacken Open Air was recorded as a bonus DVD for their next album, Carved in Stone.

In 2011, it was formed as a side project by the Rage musicians Peavy Wagner (vocals and bass), Victor Smolski (guitar and keyboard) and André Hilgers (drums) as a continuation of 1996's Lingua Mortis album, back then a true piece of pioneering work. They recorded in 2013 the debut album along with Rage LMO, with two orchestras from Spain and Belarus. The album features Metalium's ex-vocalist Henning Basse, Jeannette Marchewka and Dana Harnge as additional vocalists.

The first symphonic shows under the band's name have taken place at the 70000 Tons of Metal festival, followed by several summer festivals, among them Wacken and—still before the album's release—Masters of Rock. The last one was also recorded, and included as a bonus DVD of The Soundchaser Archives.

At this point, the Lingua Mortis Orchestra name as a "side project" was turn down by Peavy himself and became part of the band as it was originally done back in 1996. For 2019, Rage toured with the Lingua Mortis Orchestra to perform some festival shows and performed the entire XIII album.

Refuge 

In 2014, Peavy reunited with Manni Schmidt and Chris Efthimiadis, and they decided to play a secret show in their hometown, Herne, under the name "Tres Hombres". From there came the idea of the creation of Refuge, with the same Rage line-up from 1988 to 1993. The name Refuge came from one of the most known songs by Rage, "Refuge" from the album The Missing Link, which was recorded by the same line-up. Peavy said in an interview that Refuge is not a professional band as the band members have their regular jobs and families, so Refuge is more like an "extended hobby" for playing special events and festivals. Peavy also said Refuge would still be co-existing with Rage and the new line-up with Marcos and Vassilios.

In 2015, Refuge played in many festivals around Europe, including the Rock Hard Festival, which was broadcast live, and was also recorded as a new live album, Live at Rock Hard Festival for the boxset The Refuge Years.

The band's first album, Solitary Men, was released on 8 June 2018.

Band members

Current members
 Peter "Peavy" Wagner – lead vocals, bass (1984–present)
 Vassilios "Lucky" Maniatopoulos – drums, backing vocals (2015–present)
 Jean Bormann – guitars (2020–present)
 Stefan Weber – guitars (2020–present)

Former members
 Jochen Schroeder – lead guitar (1984–1987, died 2021)
 Alf Meyerratken – rhythm guitar (1984)
 Thomas Grüning – rhythm guitar (1985–1986)
 Jörg Michael – drums (1984–1987)
 Rudy Graf – rhythm guitar (1986–1987)
 Manni Schmidt – lead guitar (1987–1994)
 Chris Efthimiadis – drums (1987–1999)
 Sven Fischer – rhythm guitar (1993–1999)
 Spiros Efthimiadis – lead guitar (1994–1999)
 Victor Smolski – guitars, keyboards (1999–2015)
 Mike Terrana – drums (1999–2007)
 André Hilgers – drums (2007–2015)
 Marcos Rodriguez – guitars, backing vocals (2015–2020)

Timeline

Discography

Studio albums 
 Prayers of Steel (as Avenger) (1985)
 Reign of Fear (1986)
 Execution Guaranteed (1987)
 Perfect Man (1988)
 Secrets in a Weird World (1989)
 Reflections of a Shadow (1990)
 Trapped! (1992)
 The Missing Link (1993)
 10 Years in Rage (1994)
 Black in Mind (1995)
 Lingua Mortis (1996)
 End of All Days (1996)
 XIII (1998)
 Ghosts (1999)
 Welcome to the Other Side (2001)
 Unity (2002)
 Soundchaser (2003)
 Speak of the Dead (2006)
 Carved in Stone (2008)
 Strings to a Web (2010)
 21 (2012)
 The Devil Strikes Again (2016)
 Seasons of the Black (2017)
 Wings of Rage (2020)
 Resurrection Day (2021)

EPs 
 Depraved to Black (as Avenger) (1985)
 Invisible Horizons (1989)
 Extended Power (1991)
 Beyond the Wall (1992)
 Refuge (Japan) (1994)
 Higher than the Sky (1996)
 Live from the Vault (1997)
 In Vain - Rage in Acoustic (1998)
 Gib dich nie auf / Never Give Up (2009)
 My Way (2016)
 Spreading the Plague (2022)

Live albums 
 Power of Metal (1994)
 From the Cradle to the Stage (2004)
 Full Moon in St. Petersburg (2007)
 Live in Tokyo (2012)

Compilation albums 
 The Best from the Noise Years (1998)
 Best of – All G.U.N. Years (2001)
 The Soundchaser Archives (2014)

Box sets 
 The Lingua Mortis Trilogy (The Classic Collection) (2002)
 The Refuge Years (2015)

Videography 
 The Video Link (1994)
 Metal Meets Classic Live (2001)
 From the Cradle to the Stage (2004)
 Full Moon in St. Petersburg (2007)
 Live at Wacken '09 (2009)

Music videos

References

External links 

 
 
 Nuclear Blast – Rage site

German speed metal musical groups
German power metal musical groups
German progressive metal musical groups
Musical groups established in 1984
Participants in the Bundesvision Song Contest
German musical trios
Nuclear Blast artists
Noise Records artists
GUN Records artists